Luis Miguel Pineda Madrid (born August 3, 1988 in Montería, Córdoba) is a Colombian weightlifter. Pineda represented Colombia at the 2008 Summer Olympics in Beijing, where he competed for the men's lightweight category (69 kg), along with his teammate Edwin Mosquera. Pineda placed thirteenth in this event, as he successfully lifted 132 kg in the single-motion snatch, and hoisted 167 kg in the two-part, shoulder-to-overhead clean and jerk, for a total of 299 kg.  He won the silver medal at the 2008 Pan American Weightlifting Championships.

Major results

References

External links
NBC Olympics Profile

Colombian male weightlifters
1988 births
Living people
Olympic weightlifters of Colombia
Weightlifters at the 2008 Summer Olympics
Sportspeople from Antioquia Department
Pan American Weightlifting Championships medalists
21st-century Colombian people